Mala Mala is a game reserve located within the Sabi Sand Game Reserve, Mpumalanga province, South Africa. It is the largest and the oldest private big five game reserve in South Africa, It covers around 130 km or 15 000 hectares of land. In Xitsonga, the name Malamala means Kudu, it was named so because of the abundance of these animals within the game reserve. The Tsonga people, who occupied the land before the establishment of the game reserve, were forcibly removed from this land during the early 1900s and were dumped at Bushbuckridge. The Nwandlamhlarhi Community successfully claimed Malamala game reserve and the land was restored to them in 2015 when President Jacob Zuma handed them their land in a Government ceremony. The Tsonga people were also forcibly removed from neighbouring game reserves such as Skukuza, Satara, Ulusaba, Manyeleti, Protea Hotel Kruger Gate, Hoyo Hoyo Tsonga Lodge and may more in Southern Kruger. The Tsonga people are still waiting to be given back these lands by the Government after the finalization of their land claim.

The Sabi Sand Game Reserve borders the Kruger National Park, which together with some other parks make up the Greater Kruger National Park.

Wildlife 
This reserve contains Africa's Big Five. It was the home of Tjololo, a famous male leopard, as well as the famous Sparta lion pride. Cheetah, spotted hyena, blue wildebeest, plains zebra, hippopotamus, South African giraffe, impala, greater kudu, sable antelope and Cape hunting dog are among the other large mammals that roam here.

Accommodation 
It is composed of many camps:
 Mala Mala camp
 Mala Mala Sable camp
 Mala Mala Rattray's camp

The nearest airport is Mala Mala Airport and regular commercial flights can be boarded from Kruger Mpumalanga International Airport.

See also
 Safari park
 Sabi Sand Game Reserve
 Kruger National Park

References

Tourist attractions in South Africa
Protected areas of Mpumalanga
Nature reserves in South Africa